Zhao Keyan (born September 11, 1983) is a Chinese pop singer and rapper. He started his music career in 2014. Since then, he has become a hit in mainland China with his dance song "She won't even give me a hundred yuan" and his albums have been released in Russia, Hong Kong and Taiwan.

Personal life 
Born on September 11, 1983 in a village in Siping, Jilin Province, China, Zhao Keyan dropped out of junior high school due to family financial reasons and started farming.

In 2009, he left his hometown to work. In his spare time at work, he learned singing skills and wrote his own music, and then he began participating in regional music competitions in 2010. In April 2010, he took part in the "2010 Super Boys" competition held by Hunan Satellite TV in Shenyang, and ranked among top 100 in Shenyang district.

Music career
In April 2014, he produced and released his first music album, "Ada Love Song" at his own expense; in December, he wrote the dance song "She won't even give me a hundred yuan," for which he was nominated for the "Top 10 online Dance songs in China in 2014"
.
In December 2015, he released the song "what am I supposed to do".
On the evening of June 30, 2016, Zhao Keyan's first solo concert was held at the Shandong Gymnasium, with very few fans.

In December 2017, he signed a contract with Golden pterosaur record and released a popular ballad single, "Mr. Zhao,"
which was released simultaneously in Russia, Taiwan, and other regions.

In March 2018, he released a personal rap single, "Those things in those years."

In July of the same year, he published the folk single "That hill."

Zhao Keyan performs the song "Mr. Zhao" at a concert in changchun, jilin province, China, March 1, 2019.

Discography

Studio albums
Ada Love Song (2014)
Heartache, 2014 (心痛2014) (2014)

Singles
She won't even give me a hundred yuan (2014) (Lyrics:Zhao Keyan,Music:Zhao Keyan)
I want to sing(2014)(Lyrics:Yi Mailaiti,Music:Yi Mailaiti)
Small beautiful(2014)(Lyrics:Zhao Keyan,Music:Zhao Keyan)
Little cute(2014)(Lyrics:Zhao Keyan,Music:Zhao Keyan)
What am I supposed to do (2015) (Lyrics:Zhao Keyan,Music:Zhao Keyan)
Mr. Zhao (2017)(Lyrics:Zhao Keyan,Music:Zhao Keyan)(Lyrics:Zhao Keyan,Music:Zhao Keyan)
Those things in those years (2018)(Lyrics:Zhao Keyan,Music:Zhao Keyan,Mastering engineer:Ted Jensen)
That hill (2018)(Lyrics:Zhao Keyan,Music:Zhao Keyan)

Awards

|-
| rowspan="3"|2018 || rowspan="2"|Mr. Zhao || Outstanding music award  || 
|}

|-
| rowspan="3"|2018 || rowspan="2"|Those things in those years || Outstanding music award  || 
|}

Concerts

References

External links 
 ZhaoKeyan's official weibo

21st-century Chinese male singers
1983 births
Living people
People from Siping
Singers from Jilin